Alexandre Bardinon (born 9 May 2002) is a French-Swiss racing driver who last competed in the 2021 Formula Regional European Championship under a French license for FA Racing. He is the grandson of French businessman and Ferrari collector Pierre Bardinon and the son of racing driver Patrick Bardinon, who raced in the 80's within the Formula 3 and Formula 2 championships. He is the current owner of the Circuit du Mas du Clos, a race track founded by his grandfather in 1963.

Career

Debut in cars
In 2018 Bardinon started his racing career as he drove in the French GT4 Cup for M Racing - YMR where he achieved one podium. He also raced in V de V Challenge Monoplace for Formula Motorsport where he once again achieved one podium finish.

Formula Regional European Championship
In 2019, Bardinon signed with Mas du Clos racing for the race at Vallelunga where he finished 13th and 12th respective at both rounds. He then made the switch the VAR for the remaining rounds with the highest finish of 9th at the Hungaroring. He finished the season last with 5 points.

Euroformula Open Championship
Bardinon will race for Van Amersfoort Racing alongside the Estner brothers Sebastian and Andreas in 2020.

Racing record

Career summary

Complete Formula Regional European Championship results
(key) (Races in bold indicate pole position) (Races in italics indicate fastest lap)

† The third race in Vallelunga was cancelled due to bad weather and later run in Imola as a fourth race.

Complete Euroformula Open Championship results 
(key) (Races in bold indicate pole position) (Races in italics indicate fastest lap)

Complete F3 Asian Championship results
(key) (Races in bold indicate pole position) (Races in italics indicate the fastest lap of top ten finishers)

References

External links
 

2002 births
Living people
French racing drivers
Swiss-French people
Formula Regional European Championship drivers
F3 Asian Championship drivers
MP Motorsport drivers

Euroformula Open Championship drivers
Van Amersfoort Racing drivers
FA Racing drivers
Pinnacle Motorsport drivers